Year 539 (DXXXIX) was a common year starting on Saturday (link will display the full calendar) of the Julian calendar. At the time, it was known as the Year of the Consulship of Strategius without colleague (or, less frequently, year 1292 Ab urbe condita). The denomination 539 for this year has been used since the early medieval period, when the Anno Domini calendar era became the prevalent method in Europe for naming years.

Events 
 By place 
 Byzantine Empire 
 March – Gothic War: The Goths and the Burgundians recapture Mediolanum (modern Milan), after many months of siege, the city reaching the point of starvation. The Byzantine garrison (1,000 men) surrenders and is spared, but the inhabitants are massacred (according to Procopius 300,000 people are murdered), and the city itself is destroyed.
 Belisarius, still besieging Ravenna, negotiates a treaty with Theodebert I (whose forces are suffering from dysentery), and the Franks retreat to Gaul. The Byzantine fleet controls the Adriatic Sea and blockades the port of the capital from supplies.
 Emperor Justinian I becomes alarmed by renewed barbarian incursions across the Danube frontier from the Slavs, the Bulgars,  the Gepids, and the Avars.
 November 29 – Antioch is struck by an earthquake.

 Europe 
 Walthari murders his uncle Wacho and becomes king of the Lombards.

 Asia 
 Kinmei succeeds his brother Senka, and ascends as 29th emperor to the throne of Japan.

 By topic 
 Society 
 Fourth year of worldwide famine, a consequence of the Extreme weather events of 535–536.

Births 
 Abu Talib ibn Abd al-Muttalib, leader of the Banu Hashim and uncle of Muhammad (d. 619)
 Bertha, wife of Æthelberht of Kent
 Chilperic I, king of Neustria (approximate date)
 Maurice, emperor of the Byzantine Empire (d. 602)

Deaths 
 Senka, emperor of Japan
 Wacho, king of the Lombards

Notes and references

Notes

References